Maurilio Prini (17 August 1932 – 29 April 2009) was an Italian footballer who played as a forward. He represented the Italy national football team three times, the first being on 24 June 1956, on the occasion of a friendly match against Argentina in a 1–0 away loss.

Honours

Player

Fiorentina
Serie A: 1955–56
Lazio
Coppa Italia: 1958
Prato
Serie C: 1962–63

References

1932 births
2009 deaths
Italian footballers
Italy international footballers
Association football forwards
Empoli F.C. players
ACF Fiorentina players
S.S. Lazio players
A.C. Prato players
Serie A players
Serie C players